Barcelona is a province of eastern Spain, in the center of the autonomous community of Catalonia. The province is bordered by the provinces of Tarragona, Lleida, and Girona, and by the Mediterranean Sea.

Divisions 
The capital of the province is the city of Barcelona, and the provincial council is based in the Casa Serra on the Rambla de Catalunya in that city. Some other cities and towns in Barcelona province include L'Hospitalet de Llobregat, Badalona, Cerdanyola del Vallès, Martorell, Mataró, Granollers, Sabadell, Terrassa, Sitges, Igualada, Vic, Manresa, Berga.
See also List of municipalities in Barcelona.

Since the division by provinces in Spain and the division by comarques in Catalonia do not completely agree, the term comarques of the province of Barcelona would not be entirely correct. However, a list of the comarques that are included—totally or partially—in the province of Barcelona can be made:

Fully included:
Alt Penedès
Anoia
Bages
Baix Llobregat
Barcelonès
Garraf
Maresme
Moianès
Vallès Occidental
Vallès Oriental
Partially included:
Berguedà (all municipalities except Gósol)
Osona (all municipalities except Espinelves, Vidrà and Viladrau)
Selva (only the municipality of Fogars de la Selva)

Geography 
The Catalan Pre-Coastal Range and Catalan Coastal Range mountains run through the Province of Barcelona. There are several notable smaller mountain ranges that are located in the province, including Montseny Massif, Serra de Collserola, and Tibidabo. Pedraforca is the tallest mountain in the province, located on the north side as part of the Pre-Pyrenees. Tibidabo is the mountain that overlooks the city of Barcelona.

The majority of the Province of Barcelona has a Mediterranean climate on the coast and an oceanic climate inland.

Population development
The historical population is given in the following chart:

Notes and references

External links